The 2013–14 South African Premier Division season (known as the ABSA Premiership for sponsorship reasons) was the eighteenth season of the Premier Soccer League since its establishment in 1996. The draw for the Premier Division fixtures for the 2013/2014 season was held on 20 June 2013. The season was scheduled to begin on 2 August 2013 and end on 10 May 2014.

Kaizer Chiefs are the defending champions, having won the previous 2012–13 Premier Soccer League (PSL) season. The season featured 14 teams from the 2012-13 season and two new teams promoted from the 2012–13 National First Division: Polokwane City and Mpumalanga Black Aces who replace relegated Black Leopards and Chippa United.

Average attendance

Teams
A total of 16 teams contested the league, including 14 sides from the 2012–13 season and two promoted from the 2012–13 National First Division.

Stadiums and locations
Football teams in South Africa tend to use multiple stadiums over the course of a season for their home games. The following table will only indicate the stadium used most often by the club for their home games

Personnel and kits

Managerial changes

League table

Prize money

Statistics

Top scorers

See also
 CAF 5 Year Ranking

References

External links
Premier Soccer League (PSL) Official Website
ABSA Premiership
PSL Table,results and fixtures
PSL Results
PSL Standings

South
1
Premier Soccer League seasons